Carlos María García Cambón (27 March 1949 – 27 April 2022) was an Argentine football player and manager. In his debut for Boca Juniors, he scored four goals in the Superclásico derby against River Plate.

Playing career

García Cambón started his career with Chacarita Juniors and was part of the team that won the Metropolitano 1969 championship. He is fondly remembered by the Chacarita fans because he is their top scorer in games against their local rivals, Atlanta, with eight goals.

In 1974, García Cambón moved to Boca Juniors. His debut game is remembered as one of the most astonishing debut performances in the history of Argentine football. On 3 February 1974, he played his first game for Boca in the Superclásico against fierce rivals River Plate. The game ended 5–2 to Boca with García Cambón scoring four of their goals. He remains the only player to have scored four goals in the Superclásico. During his time at Boca, García Cambón won two league championships, the Metropolitano and Nacional titles.

In early 1977, García Cambón was sold to Unión de Santa Fe.

Coaching career
After retirement, García Cambón moved into coaching; in 1998, he was appointed caretaker coach of Boca Juniors. He went on to manage in Bolivia with Blooming and in Indonesia with Persija Jakarta.

Death
García Cambón died on 27 April 2022 after some complications related to an abdominal aortic aneurysm.

Honours
Chacarita Juniors
 Primera División: 1969 Metropolitano

Boca Juniors
 Primera División: 1976 Metropolitano, 1976 Nacional

References

External links

pictures of the 4 goals 
 Boca Museum description of the game

1949 births
2022 deaths
Footballers from Buenos Aires
Argentine footballers
Association football forwards
Argentine Primera División players
Chacarita Juniors footballers
Boca Juniors footballers
Unión de Santa Fe footballers
Argentine football managers
Boca Juniors managers
Club Blooming managers
Persija Jakarta managers
Argentine expatriate football managers
Argentine expatriate sportspeople in Bolivia
Expatriate football managers in Bolivia
Argentine expatriate sportspeople in Indonesia
Expatriate football managers in Indonesia
Deaths from abdominal aortic aneurysm